Bucculatrix albiguttella is a moth in the family Bucculatricidae. It was first described by Pierre Millière in 1886. The species is found in France (the Alpes Maritimes), Italy and on Sardinia.

The wingspan is about 8 mm. Adults have been recorded on wing in June and July.

The larvae feed on Achillea species. They mine the leaves of their host plant.

References

External links 

Natural History Museum Lepidoptera generic names catalog
Images representing Bucculatrix albiguttella at Consortium for the Barcode of Life

Bucculatricidae
Moths described in 1886
Taxa named by Pierre Millière
Moths of Europe
Leaf miners